The Veer Union is an EP by Canadian alternative rock band The Veer Union. Is the first release before their debut album Against the Grain and it contains alternate versions of songs on their debut album, and unreleased songs as well.

Track listing 
All songs written by The Veer Union.
 "Seasons" (Extended version) – 4:10
 "Over Me" (Alternate version) – 3:26
 "Falling Apart" – 3:57
 "Another World Away" – 3:46
 "Wish You Well" – 3:37
 "Hide The Truth" – 3:39

References
The Veer Union (EP)
EMURG | Review: The Veer Union - EP
Review: The Veer Union – EP - tunelab

2009 EPs
The Veer Union albums